At the 2009 World Games in Kaohsiung, three different roller sports disciplines were contested: artistic roller skating, inline speed skating and inline hockey. The speed events were held July 17–19 at Yangming Skating Rink. The artistic events took place July 21–22 and the inline hockey competition occurred July 23–26, both at the I-Shou University Gymnasium.

Artistic roller skating

Inline speed skating

Men

Women

Inline hockey

Men

References

External links
 
 
 
 

2009 World Games
2009 in roller sports
World Games 2009
2009 World Games